Flat Bush (also known as Ormiston or Flatbush) is a southeastern suburb in the city of Auckland, New Zealand. It has recently become one of the city's largest new planned towns after being developed as a rural area of Auckland for several decades. Located near Manukau Heights, plans for substantial expansion began under the Manukau City Council - having bought 290 hectares in the area in 1996.

As of 2022, substantial residential development means the area has grown to over 34,000 people, a similar population to Nelson, and includes a newly-opened shopping mall - Ormiston Town Centre.

Demographics

Flat Bush had a population of 26,040 at the 2018 New Zealand census, an increase of 7,803 people (42.8%) since the 2013 census, and an increase of 13,830 people (113.3%) since the 2006 census. There were 6,513 households, comprising 13,005 males and 13,035 females, giving a sex ratio of 1.0 males per female, with 5,535 people (21.3%) aged under 15 years, 6,264 (24.1%) aged 15 to 29, 12,087 (46.4%) aged 30 to 64, and 2,160 (8.3%) aged 65 or older.

Ethnicities were 20.6% European/Pākehā, 6.1% Māori, 10.9% Pacific peoples, 65.9% Asian, and 4.4% other ethnicities. People may identify with more than one ethnicity.

The percentage of people born overseas was 61.4, compared with 27.1% nationally.

Although some people chose not to answer the census's question about religious affiliation, 30.1% had no religion, 33.2% were Christian, 0.4% had Māori religious beliefs, 14.4% were Hindu, 5.0% were Muslim, 5.6% were Buddhist and 7.2% had other religions.

Of those at least 15 years old, 6,015 (29.3%) people had a bachelor's or higher degree, and 2,691 (13.1%) people had no formal qualifications. 3,402 people (16.6%) earned over $70,000 compared to 17.2% nationally. The employment status of those at least 15 was that 11,214 (54.7%) people were employed full-time, 2,439 (11.9%) were part-time, and 825 (4.0%) were unemployed.

History

Flat Bush gets its name from early settlers who named the area from the odd flat bush that characterised it, especially when viewed from the surrounding mountains. However, swathes of new residential subdivisions were dubbed Ormiston in the mid-2000s, due to Botany Community Board concerns around associating with Otara - a socioeconomically deprived and ethnically diverse part of the city.

While most of Flat Bush is being developed by the private sector, Auckland Council has guided the overall development of the area. 

The suburb contains the 94-hectare Barry Curtis Park, named in recognition of Manukau's longest standing mayor, Barry Curtis, with a development programme stretching into the 2020s. New Zealand's first cable-stayed bridge, on Ormiston Road, runs through the middle of the park. The bridge was opened in October 2008, while the first stage of the park was opened in 2009. 

A neighbouring 20 hectare town centre was planned to be developed starting in 2010, with the development rights taken over by Todd Property in 2010. Building of houses has started next to Barry Curtis Park as of 2012. More land in the area is going to be developed over the next few years by Todd Property Group. In 2018, Panuku Development Auckland, Auckland Council's property management CCO, was involved in construction of Ormiston Town Centre in conjunction with Todd Property.

The suburb's new shopping centre, Ormiston Town Centre, was officially opened to the public on 25 March 2021, offers supermarket, gyms, a department store, food and beverage, and a mix of health and beauty and speciality services, including ASB, Unichem Pharmacy, 2Degrees and SnapFitness plus a variety of other stores will expect to open.

Education
A strategy to build schools in the area was developed by the Ministry of Education in 2007.

Ormiston Junior College covers years 7–10 and has a roll of  students. Ormiston Primary School is a contributing primary school (years 1–6) with  students. The three schools are spread over two blocks. The Senior College opened in 2011, the Junior College in 2017, and the primary school in 2015.

Baverstock Oaks opened in 2005 and Te Uho o te Nikau in 2019.

Sancta Maria Catholic Primary School is a state-integrated contributing primary school  (years 1–6) with  students. The two schools are on the same site. The college opened in 2004 and the primary school in 2010.

The school was founded in 1981.

All these schools are coeducational. Rolls are as of

References

External links
Photographs of Flat Bush held in Auckland Libraries' heritage collections.

Suburbs of Auckland
Howick Local Board Area